CCR v. Bush is a legal action by the Center for Constitutional Rights against the George W. Bush administration, challenging the National Security Agency's (NSA's) surveillance of people within the United States, including the interception of CCR emails without first securing a warrant.
The lawsuit was filed on January 17, 2006.
The center's lawyers argued that the warrantless wiretap program was: "... illegal because it lacks judicial approval or statutory authorization,"

The center's description of the suit stated:

The Center filed for summary judgment on March 9, 2006.
The Center quoted a letter to the United States Senate from then-Attorney-General Alberto Gonzales:

On December 11, 2015 the center announced that the Appeals Court stands by decision to allow lawsuit against high-level Bush officials for Post-9/11 abuses. The Second Circuit panel roundly rejected the government's national security justification for racial profiling, writing:

References

External links

Presidency of George W. Bush
Mass surveillance litigation
United States District Court for the Southern District of New York cases
2015 in United States case law
National Security Agency
United States lawsuits
United States District Court case articles without infoboxes